Thawi Watthana is one of the two khwaengs (sub-districts) of Thawi Watthana District, Bangkok's Thonburi side, apart from Sala Thammasop.  In 2015 it had a population of 22,552 people, with total area of 21.521 km2 (8.3093 mi2). It is the location of the district office, and can be considered as the southern part of the district.

Geography
Neighboring sub-districts are (from north clockwise) Sala Thammasop, Bang Phrom and Bang Chueak Nang of Taling Chan District, Bang Phai of Bang Khae and Nong Khang Phlu of Nong Khaem Districts, Salaya of Phutthamonthon and Krathum Lom of Sam Phran Districts, Nakhon Pathom Province.

Like the Sala Thammasop, it can be considered as the agricultural zone with a good atmosphere and fresh air, because it is a suburb Bangkok.

History
It is named after Khlong Thawi Watthana, that flows through the area. Originally, it was a tambon, part of Amphoe Taling Chan of Thon Buri Province. Until new zoning was organized on March 6, 1998, Thawi Watthana therefore promoted to district and sub-district until now.

Places
Thonburi Market or Sanam Luang II
Thawi Wanarom Park
Bangkokthonburi University
Rajdamnern Sport Complex
Thawi Watthana Palace
Utthayan Avenue

References

Thawi Watthana district
Subdistricts of Bangkok